

Longmu, also Longmu Co or Longmucuo, is a glacial lake in Rutog County in the Ngari Prefecture in the northwest of the Tibet Autonomous Region of China. It was explored in 1989 in a Sino-French expedition to western Tibet.

Climate

Map gallery

Notes

References

Ngari Prefecture
Lakes of Tibet